The 1955–56 NCAA men's basketball season began in December 1955, progressed through the regular season and conference tournaments, and concluded with the 1956 NCAA basketball tournament championship game on March 24, 1956, at McGaw Hall in Evanston, Illinois. The San Francisco Dons won their second NCAA national championship with an 83–71 victory over the Iowa Hawkeyes.

Season headlines 
 The Ivy League, which had been formally established as an athletic conference in 1954, played its first basketball season under that name. Previously, Ivy League schools had competed in the Eastern Intercollegiate Basketball League; today's Ivy League considers the EIBL as part of its history.
 The Philadelphia Big 5, an informal association of colleges and universities in Philadelphia, Pennsylvania, focused on college basketball, began play. The Big 5 teams played a regular-season round robin schedule with one another each year through the 1990–91 season with the results determining an informal Big 5 championship, and revived the round-robin schedule during the 1998–99 season.
 The NCAA tournament expanded from 24 to 25 teams.
 For the first time, the four regional competitions of the NCAA Tournament receive names. In 1956, they are named the East, Midwest, West, and Far West Regions.
 For the last time, the NCAA held only a single championship tournament. The following season, it divided teams into a University Division and a College Division and began holding a separate tournament for each division.
 San Francisco won its second consecutive NCAA championship.

Major rule changes 
Beginning in 1955–56, the following rules changes were implemented:
 The two-shot penalty in the last three minutes of the game was eliminated. The "one-and-one" free throw, in which a player shoots a second free throw only if he makes his first, went into effect for the entire game.

Season outlook

Pre-season polls 

The top 20 from the AP Poll during the pre-season.

Conference membership changes

Regular season

Conference winners and tournaments

Informal championships

Statistical leaders

Post-season tournaments

NCAA tournament 

Coach Phil Woolpert and his star Bill Russell successfully guided San Francisco to its second consecutive championship, capping an undefeated season. The Dons became the first team in college basketball history to go undefeated and win the NCAA tournament. Temple's Hal Lear was named tournament Most Outstanding Player.

Final Four 
Played at McGaw Hall in Evanston, Illinois

 Third Place – Temple 90, SMU 81

National Invitation tournament 

Louisville won its first NIT title, defeating Dayton 83–80. Louisville's Charlie Tyra won MVP honors

NIT Semifinals and Final 
Played at Madison Square Garden in New York City 

 Third Place – St. Joseph's 93, St. Francis (NY) 82

Award winners

Consensus All-American teams

Major player of the year awards 
 Helms Foundation Player of the Year: Bill Russell, San Francisco
 UPI Player of the Year: Bill Russell, San Francisco

Major coach of the year awards 
 UPI Coach of the Year: Phil Woolpert, San Francisco

Other major awards 

 Robert V. Geasey Trophy (Top player in Philadelphia Big 5): Guy Rodgers, Temple
 NIT/Haggerty Award (Top player in NYC area): Bill Thieben, Hofstra

Coaching changes 

A number of teams changed coaches during the season and after it ended.

References